Major League Soccer is the premier professional soccer league in the United States and Canada. As of 2022, it consists of 28 teams: 25 in the United States and 3 in Canada. The league has played since 1996. Each year, it plays a league which determines entry into the playoffs. The league is divided into two conferences, the Eastern Conference and Western Conference. In 2000 and 2001, there was also a Central Conference. The team with the overall best regular-season record is awarded the Supporters' Shield, one of three major domestic trophies in North American soccer (the others being the national championships—the U.S. Open Cup or the Canadian Championship—and the primary trophy: the MLS Cup league championship). In 2010 and 2011, the league played as a double round robin, with each team playing each other team one home and away—creating a balanced schedule. With an unsuitable number of teams beginning in 2012, the league has moved to an unbalanced schedule weighted towards a team's respective conference.

The postseason consists of a 14-team, four-round knockout. The top team in each conference enters in the overall quarterfinal round, while the remaining teams from each conference playoff for a spot in that round. The MLS Cup is a single match final with the winner becoming league champion of the year. Seven times a team has won the league double: winning both the MLS Cup and the Supporters' Shield in the same season. In 2017, Toronto FC became the first team to win a domestic treble. The MLS Golden Boot is awarded each year to the player with the most goals in the regular season, and the best overall player is awarded the Landon Donovan MVP Award.

List of seasons
The following is a list of all MLS seasons. It contains the number of teams, the number of regular-season games played per team, the champion—winner of the MLS Cup, the winners of the regular-season Eastern Conference, the Western Conference, and for 2000 and 2001, the defunct Central Division, the winner of the Most Valuable Player Award (MVP), the top scorer(s), and the regular-season average attendance.

See also
List of American and Canadian soccer champions

References

 
Seasons